The Baker–Barry Tunnel connects the former military bases Fort Barry and Fort Baker in the Marin Headlands of Marin County, California. The bases are now part of the Golden Gate National Recreation Area. The tunnel is also known as the Bunker Road Tunnel for the road that runs through it, or as the Five-Minute Tunnel because it is only wide enough to accommodate a single reversible lane, opened to traffic at either end for five minute intervals.

History
Although geographically close, Forts Baker (on the east) and Barry (on the west) are separated by steep terrain. Travel between the two forts was difficult, and was typically handled by boat. Although a "crude and treacherous" road connected the two forts by land, the post commander complained in 1911 there was no protection to keep users from falling over the side of the road. In response, the War Department allocated $1,500 for board fencing to protect road users at the most dangerous locations. Due to the danger of land travel, a separate school was established at Fort Barry in 1913.

The tunnel was constructed by the U.S. Army after plans were made in late 1915 to expand Fort Barry. Those plans were firmed up in 1916, and construction started in 1917, completing in 1918. The tunnel was listed as a contributing structure for the Forts Baker, Barry, and Cronkhite Historic District on December 12, 1973.

Catastrophic failure was not likely, but chunks of concrete had spalled and fallen to the roadway, creating a safety hazard. After a rebuild was completed in 1994, the tunnel reopened in 1995.

The tunnel was again closed for repairs between January and June 2017. Workers sealed cracks in the vintage concrete to reduce seepage, repaved the road, replaced water and sewer lines, and installed energy-efficient LED lighting. Prior to the 2017 rehabilitation, the tunnel was the second-largest consumer of power in the entire Golden Gate National Recreation Area (after district headquarters in San Francisco). During the shutdown, traffic was rerouted to Conzelman Road, a coastal route which is popular among tourists for scenic views of the Golden Gate.

Design

The Baker–Barry Tunnel lies beneath the U.S. 101 (Redwood) highway, just south of where the highway itself goes through a tunnel on the Waldo Grade. It is cut through serpentine rock and as completed in 1918, was supported with a timber structure and featured a macadam road with cobblestone gutters. The timber was reused from a grandstand.

Electric and water lines were run through the tunnel in 1922. The tunnel was rebuilt in 1925 at a cost of $16,618 after much of the lagging and timbers had rotted due to seepage in the tunnel. The rebuild also added galvanized iron and trenches to try to keep moisture out, along with barbed wire fencing to prevent cattle from entering the tunnel. A rockslide in the tunnel closed it in late 1926, prompting another round of repairs which began in 1928.

Work on the tunnel did not resume until August 1936.

Caltrans extended the eastern portion of the tunnel by  when the Redwood Highway was rebuilt in 1953.

Electricity consumption was reduced by 40% with the switch to LED lighting. Prior to the 2017 work, the stalactites that had formed from the water seeping through the rock and concrete were removed and displayed at the Exploratorium in San Francisco. The amount of water leaking through the cracks led some to nickname certain areas of the tunnel "the car wash."

Traffic notes
Automotive traffic through the tunnel is controlled by traffic lights at each end of the tunnel, which allows one-way traffic for five minutes at a time. The single reversible lane for cars is flanked by two bicycle lanes on either side. The five-minute wait is billed as "the longest stoplight in America." Bunker Road itself is named for Col. Paul Bunker, who died in a Japanese prison camp in 1943.

See also
List of tunnels documented by the Historic American Engineering Record in California

References

External links

Road tunnels in California
Tunnels in the San Francisco Bay Area
Golden Gate National Recreation Area
Historic American Engineering Record in California
Transportation buildings and structures in Marin County, California
Sausalito, California
Transportation in Marin County, California
Tunnels completed in 1918
Roads with a reversible lane